Leionema equestre, commonly known as Kangaroo Island phebalium,  is a  shrub species that is endemic to  South Australia. It is a small spreading shrub with rough, green leaves and whitish-pink flowers from late winter to October.

Description
The flower  petals spreading, separated, smooth, narrowly elliptic, pink and darkening toward a pointed tip. The 10 stamens are in a two row formation, upright, mostly light yellow or occasionally pink. Flowering occurs from August to October.

Taxonomy and naming
Kangaroo Island phebalium was first formally described as Phebalium equestre but the name was changed to Leionema equestre in 1998 by Paul G. Wilson and the description was published in the journal Nuytsia. The specific epithet equestre is derived from Latin meaning belonging to horsemen, in reference to the shape of the leaves.

Distribution
This species has a restricted distribution, only found on Kangaroo Island South Australia.

Conservation status
Leionema equestre is classified as "endangered" by the Government of South Australia Environment Protection and Biodiversity Conservation Act 1999.

References

equestre
Sapindales of Australia
Flora of South Australia
Taxa named by Paul G. Wilson